Māris is a Latvian masculine given name, a cognate of the English Maurice and may refer to:
Māris Ārbergs (born 1962), Latvian politician
Māris Bogdanovičs (born 1991), Latvian cyclist
Māris Bičevskis (born 1991), Latvian ice hockey player
Māris Bružiks (born 1962), Latvian triple jumper
Māris Čaklais (1940–2003), Latvian poet, writer, and journalist
Māris Diļevka (born 1992), Latvian ice hockey player
Māris Gailis (born 1951), Latvian politician, former Prime Minister of Latvia
Māris Grīnblats (born 1955), Latvian politician
Māris Gulbis (born 1985), Latvian basketball player
Māris Jass (born 1985), Latvian ice hockey forward
Māris Jučers (born 1987), Latvian ice hockey goaltender 
Māris Krakops (born 1978), Latvian chess Grandmaster
Māris Kučinskis (born 1961), Latvian politician
Māris Ļaksa (born 1981), Latvian basketball player
Māris Liepa (1936–1989), Latvian-Soviet ballet dancer
Māris Martinsons (born 1960), Latvian film director, producer and screenwriter
Māris Poikāns (born 1962), Latvian bobsledder
Māris Purgailis (born 1947), Latvian politician
Māris Riekstiņš (born 1963), Latvian politician and diplomat
Māris Smirnovs (born 1976) Latvian football defender
Māris Štrombergs (born 1987) Latvian professional BMX racer and Olympic gold medalist
Māris Urtāns (born 1981), Latvian shot putter
Māris Verpakovskis (born 1979), Latvian football forward
Māris Ziediņš (born 1978), Latvian ice hockey forward
Māris Ziediņš (born 1990), basketball player

See also
 Maris (disambiguation)
 Mariss Jansons
 Mariss Vetra

References

Latvian masculine given names

ru:Марис